is a Japanese voice actress from Tokyo, Japan.  She also provides the voice samples for Crypton Future Media's Vocaloid character, Megurine Luka. Asakawa is currently a freelance voice actress and was previously attached to Arts Vision (as of October 1, 2014).

She was previously married to fellow voice actor Showtaro Morikubo but the two are now divorced. She served as a co-host of an internet webshow Otaku Verse Zero with Patrick Macias, a previous editor-in-chief of Otaku USA.

She is best known for her role as Rider and her various other incarnations of the character from the Fate/stay night franchise.

Filmography

Theatrical animation
Cyber Team in Akihabara: 2011 Summer Vacation (1999) as Tsugumi Higashijujo
Azumanga Daioh: The Animation (2001) as Sakaki
Hamtaro film series (2001–2004) as Tongari
RahXephon: Pluralitas Concentio (2003) as Shinobu Miwa
Mobile Suit Zeta Gundam: A New Translation (2005) as Rosamia Badam
Hells Angels (2008) as Kuronora
Fate/stay night: Unlimited Blade Works (2010) as Rider
K-ON! the Movie (2011) as Norimi Kawaguchi
Fate/stay night: Heaven's Feel (2017-2020) as Rider
Detective Conan: The Fist of Blue Sapphire (2019) as Sherilyn Tan

Tokusatsu
 Tetsuwan Tantei Robotack (1998) as Mimeena
 Chousei Kantai Sazer-X (2005) as Water General Aqual

Anime television

Dubbing

Video games

References

External links

1975 births
Living people
Arts Vision voice actors
Japanese video game actresses
Japanese voice actresses
Vocaloid voice providers
Voice actresses from Tokyo
20th-century Japanese actresses
21st-century Japanese actresses